The St. Nikolai-Kirche, (Nikolaikirche or St. Nicholas' Church) is the oldest church in Berlin, the capital of Germany. The church is located in the eastern part of central Berlin, the borough of Mitte. The area around the church, bounded by Spandauer Straße, Rathausstraße, the River Spree and Mühlendamm, is known as the Nikolaiviertel 'Nicholas quarter', and is an area of restored medieval buildings (in some cases recent imitations). The church was built between 1220 and 1230, and is thus, along with the Church of Our Lady at Alexanderplatz not far away, the oldest church in Berlin.

History
Originally a Roman Catholic church, the Church of St. Nicholas became a Lutheran church after the Protestant Reformation in the Electorate of Brandenburg in 1539. In the 17th century, the prominent hymn-writer Paul Gerhardt was the minister of this church, and the composer Johann Crueger was musical director. The prominent Lutheran theologian Provost Philipp Jacob Spener was the minister from 1691 to 1705. From 1913 to 1923, the minister at the Church of St. Nicholas was Wilhelm Wessel, whose son Horst Wessel later became famous as a Nazi: the family lived in the nearby Jüdenstraße.

On Reformation Day in 1938 (October 31) the church building served its congregation for the last time. Then the building, the oldest structure in Berlin proper, was given up to the government, to be used as a concert hall and ecclesiastical museum. The number of parishioners had shrunk due to the ever intensifying gentrification of the inner city, as residential premises became superseded by offices and shops. The congregation later merged with that of the Church of Our Lady.

During World War II, the Church of St. Nicholas had its roof and the tops of its towers destroyed as a result of Allied bombing. In 1949 all the vaults and the northern pillars collapsed. The ruins were located in East Berlin, and it was not until 1981 that the officially atheist East German Democratic Republic authorities permitted the rebuilding of the church with old designs and plans. Thus, the Church of St. Nicholas as seen today is largely a reconstruction. Today the church serves again as a museum and as a regular concert venue, administered by the Stiftung Stadtmuseum Berlin (Landesmuseum für Kultur und Geschichte Berlins). There is an organ recital there almost every Friday at 5pm. It is renowned for its acoustics and the rebuilt church has been equipped with a fine set of 41 bells.

Organ 
The current organ was made by the firm Jehmlich (Dresden). It has 44 stops on three manuals.

 Couplers I/II, III/I, III/II, I/P, II/P, III/P
 256-position sequencer

References

External links

 Nikolaikirche
 Stiftung Stadtmuseum Berlin
 Museum Nikolaikirche

Nicholas Mitte
Nicholas
Nicholas
Nicholas
Berlin Nicholas
Berlin Nicholas
Nicholas Mitte
Berlin Nicholas
Berlin Nicholas
Nicholas
Rebuilt buildings and structures in Berlin
Berlin Nicholas
Churches completed in 1243